Altenia inscriptella is a moth of the family Gelechiidae. It is found in the Russian Far East, Japan and Korea.

The wingspan is 12–16 mm. Adults are similar to Altenia scriptella, but the ground colour of the forewings is creamy white, suffused with grey scales and much more distinct dark grey markings.

The larvae feed on Acer ginnala.

References

Altenia
Moths of Asia
Moths described in 1882